Aspasia (c. 4th century AD) was an ancient Greek, Athenian physician who concentrated on obstetrics and gynecology. During this time period in ancient Greece, women did not have access to higher education, so they found themselves restrained to common housekeeping roles. The ancient Greeks viewed medicine as a divine science that came as a gift from the gods, so they did not allow women or slaves to become educated in medicine. It wasn’t until Greek historian Xenophon (ca 430 BC to 354 BC), who helped create a piece of local legislation in Athens stating, that women should have the social role of protecting their family’s health, creating the path towards medico-philosophy. It wasn’t until the Roman Emperor Julius Caesar (100 BC to 44 BC), who ordered that all women who were educated in medicine should be granted special privileges, that women could gain citizenship and be relieved  from almost all taxes.After the proclamation from Julius Caesar, women began to adopt new roles in medicine as physicians, midwives, surgeons, druggists, herb collectors, nurses, therapists and wet nurses. It was during this time when Aspasia became such an impressive physician who made many valuable discoveries on the medico-philosophical knowledge, challenging the sex barrier in ancient Greece. 

She gained fame as a midwife and gynecologist, founding the origins of the obstetrical practice, regarding both early techniques of induced abortions and the surgical management of the early failure of pregnancy. She frequently tried to impress upon her patients the necessity of extreme carefulness in order to avoid abortion. Her work influenced physicians and surgeons of the Byzantine period, including Aetius of Amida, and Paul of Aegina. She was highly regarded by fellow physicians of her age, with Aetius considering her as a medical genius and at least equivalent to the best male surgeons of her time. Aspasia would advise her pregnant patients to avoid chariot rides, violent exercise, and avoid spicy foods in order to reduce the chance of an unwanted abortion. Because Aspasia was trustworthy and exceptional at being a physician, she would perform abortions only if the pregnant women’s life is endangered or if there was some other conditional making the patient unsuitable for pregnancy.

Aspasia introduced her own surgical techniques for uterine hemorrhoids, varicoceles, and hydroceles, both of which are similar to recent, modern methods. She developed a technique for moving a breech baby to ease delivery. Considered to be one of Aspasia's most notable contributions to medicine, her operation for the treatment of uterine hemorrhoids would prove to be extremely beneficial. This is due to the fact that uterine hemorrhoids were a common and often painful affliction for women in the ancient world. Aspasia's operation was later adopted by Aetius, a well-known physician who lived in the 6th century. Aetius was known for his comprehensive medical treatise, in which he described Aspasia's operation in detail. “The ones that are hard, more prolapsed and may bleed have to be dissected imminently. The ones that are bleeding have to be dissected after they have circularly incised around their base and enfolded tightly with a loop”. This treatise proposed by Aetius was widely read and studied and helped to spread the knowledge of Aspasia's operation throughout the medical community.She also worked on preventive medicine with pregnant women.

Aspasia also made contributions surrounding the dissection of varicoceles and hydrocele. Her technique she used to deal with varicoceles is not far in its concept from today’s methods. Aspasia would create a linear incision, smoothly setting apart  the adjacent tissues, litigation of the vessel via loops and, afterwards, the excision. Her method dealing with hydrocele mimics the typical hydrocelectomy in which the fluids are drained from the tunica vaginalis and is still an acceptable practice today. Aspasia would create a linear incision parallel to the lump, then separate superficial skin and the subjacent tissues. She would split the tissues by cutting through the integument containing the fluid with a seared surgical clasp, removing the rest of the fluid and pus in order to close up the incision.

There have been doubts raised as to whether Aspasia actually existed, due to the fact that the only appearance of her in the medical tradition is being quoted extensively in the final, gynaecological book of Aetius' medical encyclopedia.

References 

4th-century Greek physicians
4th-century Greek women
Ancient Greek women physicians
Roman-era Athenian women